The Communist Party of the Workers of Spain (abbreviated PCTE) is a Marxist–Leninist communist party in Spain. The PCTE was founded on March 3, 2019 as the result of a split in the Communist Party of the Peoples of Spain (PCPE). The youth organization of the PCTE is called the Collectives of Communist Youth.

History 
The PCTE contested both the April 2019 Spanish general election (14,189 votes, 0.05%) and the election for the European Parliament (19,081, 0.09%). On the same day of the European parliament election the PCTE competed in five regional elections and in sixteen municipalities. It won two seats in the former mining municipality of Degaña in southwestern Asturias. It also supported the local list  (ACPT), which also won two seats.

At the November 2019 election the PCTE is fielding candidates in 37 provinces, compared to the 27 provinces the party contested at the previous election.

Election results

References

External links 
 Party website

2019 establishments in Spain
Communist parties in Spain
Far-left politics in Spain
Political parties established in 2019
International Meeting of Communist and Workers Parties